Giardiniera is an Italian relish of pickled vegetables in vinegar or oil.

Varieties and uses

Italian giardiniera is also called sottaceti ("under vinegar"), a common term for pickled foods. It is typically eaten as an antipasto or with salads.

In the United States, giardiniera is commonly available in traditional or spicy varieties, and the latter is sometimes referred to as "hot mix".

Giardiniera is a versatile condiment that can be used on a variety of different foods, such as bratwurst, bruschetta, burgers, pasta salad, eggs (omelets), hot dogs, tuna salad, sandwiches, and much more. In the U.S. it is not uncommon to use giardiniera on pasta.

In the cuisine of Chicago, an oil-based giardiniera is 
often used as a condiment, typically as a topping on Italian beef sandwiches, subs, and pizza.

A milder variety of giardiniera is used for the olive salad in the muffuletta sandwich.

Ingredients
The Italian version includes bell peppers, celery, carrots, cauliflower and gherkins. The pickled vegetables are marinated in oil, red- or white-wine vinegar, herbs and spices.

Chicago-style giardiniera is commonly made spicy with sport peppers or chili flakes, along with a combination of assorted vegetables, including bell peppers, celery, carrots, cauliflower, and sometimes gherkins or olives, all marinated in vegetable oil, olive oil, soybean oil, or any combination of the three. Some commercially prepared versions are labeled "Chicago-style giardiniera".

See also

 Encurtido – a pickled vegetable appetizer, side dish and condiment in the Mesoamerican region

References

Condiments
Cuisine of the Midwestern United States
Italian cuisine
Italian-American cuisine
Pickles
Vegetable dishes
Brassica oleracea dishes
Vegetarian cuisine

nl:Tafelzuur